The 1920 United States presidential election in Massachusetts took place on November 2, 1920, as part of the 1920 United States presidential election, which was held throughout all contemporary 48 states. Voters chose 18 representatives, or electors to the Electoral College, who voted for president and vice president.

Massachusetts was won in a landslide by Republican Senator Warren G. Harding of Ohio, who was running against Democratic Governor James M. Cox of Ohio. Harding's running mate was Governor Calvin Coolidge of Massachusetts, while Cox ran with Assistant Secretary of the Navy Franklin D. Roosevelt of New York. Also running that year was Socialist candidate Eugene V. Debs of Indiana and his running mate Seymour Stedman of Illinois.

Harding carried Massachusetts overwhelmingly with 68.55% of the vote to Cox's 27.84%, a Republican victory margin of 40.71%. Debs finished third, with 3.25%.

Massachusetts had long been a typical Yankee Republican bastion in the wake of the Civil War, having voted Republican in every election since 1856, except in 1912, when former Republican President Theodore Roosevelt had run as a Progressive candidate against incumbent Republican President William Howard Taft, splitting the Republican vote and allowing Democrat Woodrow Wilson to win Massachusetts with a plurality of only 35.53% of the vote. In 1916, the state had returned to the Republican column, although only by a fairly narrow 4-point margin.

With the deeply unpopular Democratic administration of Woodrow Wilson as the backdrop for the 1920 campaign, Warren G. Harding promised a "return to normalcy" that appealed to many voters, while Cox was tied to the policies of the Wilson administration, whose unpopularity was especially severe among Irish-Americans who saw Wilson as pro-Britain and against their independence. Harding won nationally in one of the most decisive landslides in American history, and Massachusetts, already a fiercely Republican state, went even harder for Harding than the nation, voting a solid 15% more Republican than the national average.

Harding was also helped in the state by his running mate, Calvin Coolidge, a traditional Yankee Republican born in neighboring Vermont and being the popular sitting Governor of Massachusetts.

Harding swept every county in the state of Massachusetts, including even Suffolk County, home to the state's capital and largest city, Boston. Boston had been a Democratic-leaning city prior to this, and while Calvin Coolidge would win the city once more for the GOP in 1924, Boston would defect to the Democrats for Catholic Al Smith in 1928 and become reliably Democratic in every election that followed. As Coolidge won Suffolk County with a plurality in 1924, 1920 thus remains the last election in which a Republican has won an absolute majority of the vote in Suffolk County.

In 13 of the state's 14 counties (all but Suffolk), Harding broke 60% of the vote, and in nine, Harding broke seventy percent. He even reached eighty percent in the island county of Dukes and peninsular Barnstable.

Results

Results by county

See also
 United States presidential elections in Massachusetts

References

Massachusetts
1920
1920 Massachusetts elections